The 2012 Korea National League was the tenth season of the Korea National League.

Teams

Regular season

League table

Results

Championship playoffs

Bracket

First round

Second round

Semi-final

Final

See also
 2012 in South Korean football
 2012 Korea National League Championship
 2012 Korean FA Cup

References

External links

Korea National League seasons